Dylan Ferguson may refer to:

 Dylan Ferguson (skier) (born 1988), American freestyle skier
 Dylan Ferguson (ice hockey) (born 1998), Canadian hockey player